Zara is a town and a district of Sivas Province of Turkey. The mayor is Fatih Celik (MHP). The town is 70 km. (appr. 45 miles) away from Sivas downtown.

History
In antiquity, Zara was a town in the northern part of Armenia Minor, or perhaps more correctly in Pontus, on the road from Caesarea to Satala, and at the same time on that from Arabissus to Nicopolis.

Economy
Historically, silver was extracted from lead in Zara. Coal, asbestos, and arsenic were also produced in the area.

Localities 
 Kuzören

References

Populated places in Sivas Province
Districts of Sivas Province
Kurdish settlements in Turkey
Zara District